Oroperipatus cameranoi is a species of velvet worm in the Peripatidae family. This species ranges from 34 mm to 55 mm in length. Females of this species have 34 to 36 pairs of legs; males have 32. The type locality is in Ecuador.

References

Onychophorans of tropical America
Onychophoran species
Animals described in 1899